The River Dibb is located in North Yorkshire, England. It is a tributary of the River Wharfe.

Toponymy
The name is possibly derived from the Olde English dib, a dialectical form of dip meaning hollow, or deep place pool. The name of Dybb/Dibb is recorded in local 14th century records as Dybbe, a now lost hamlet near Burnsall, where the people who lived there were lead miners.

Course
The river starts from the south side of Grimwith Reservoir and flows south-west through Burnett Fold Nook and then south before returning south-west to pass under the B6265 at Dibble's Bridge, which has been the scene of two coach crashes - one in 1925 when seven people were killed, and one in 1975 when 33 people were killed. Below its confluence with Holes Beck, the Ordnance Survey maps show the name of the river changing to Barben Beck. It follows a mostly southerly course through Rough Close Wood and Barnscar Plantation to Rookcroft Wood. It turns west through Sprinsgide Wood and then south-west again past Hartlington Mill, where it was once used to power a  diameter undershot water wheel, and under Hartlington Bridge before joining the River Wharfe. 

The river flows for  largely over millstone grit, which overlays limestone and shales. A leat used to take water from a high point of the river (between the overflow of the reservoir and Dibbles Bridge) to a lead mine near to Barben Beck.

Ecology
The river is noted as having white-clawed crayfish, brown trout and arctic char present. The arctic char were introduced into Grimwith Reservoir from Windermere in 1989, 1990, and 1991. Surveys detected the fish in the River Dibb in 1995 and 1998. In 2015, Yorkshire Water agreed to keep a constant flow in the river from Grimwith Reservoir. As the designation of Grimwith Reservoir is one of compensation when needed in times of low water flow in the Wharfe and beyond, the river historically could run dry, making it difficult for wildlife to survive in the river. Yorkshire Water are required to allow  to flow into the River Wharfe from Grimwith Reservoir via the River Dibb on a daily basis.

Folklore
Dibble's Bridge is sometimes referred to as Devil's Bridge. It is traditionally said to have been built by the Devil for a shoemaker named Ralph Calvert, after Calvert offered the Devil a drink.

Lists

Tributaries
 Birsta Gill Dike
 Stone Gill Dike
 Holes Beck

Settlements
 Dibble's Bridge
 Hartlington

Crossings
 B6265 Dibble's Bridge
 Hartlington Bridge

References

Dibb